National Route 6 (Korean: 국도 제6호선; Gukdo Je Yuk(6) Hoseon)is a major highway on the Korea It connects Incheon with the city of Gangneung, Gangwon Province,

Main stopovers 
 Incheon
 Jung District - Dong District - Nam District - Dong District - Seo District - Gyeyang District

 Gyeonggi Province
 Bucheon

 Seoul
 Gangseo District

 Gyeonggi Province
 Bucheon

 Seoul
 Gangseo District - Yangcheon District - Yeongdeungpo District - Yanghwa Bridge - Mapo District - Seodaemun District - Jongno District - Dongdaemun District - Jungnang District

 Gyeonggi Province
 Guri - Namyangju - Yangpyeong County

 Gangwon Province
 Hoengseong County - Pyeongchang County - Gangneung

Major intersections

 (■): Motorway
IS: Intersection, IC: Interchange

Incheon

Gyeonggi Province Bucheon

Seoul

Gyeonggi Province

Gangwon Province

References

6
Roads in Incheon
Roads in Gyeonggi
Roads in Seoul
Roads in Gangwon